Bamboutos is a department of West Region in Cameroon. The department covers an area of 1,173 km and as of 2005 had a total population of 292,410. The capital of the department lies at Mbouda.

Subdivisions
The department is divided administratively into 4 communes and in turn into villages.

Communes 
 Babadjou
 Batcham
 Galim
 Mbouda

See also
Communes of Cameroon

References

Departments of Cameroon
West Region (Cameroon)